Cooper Bridge was a railway station built by the Manchester and Leeds Railway to serve the town of Huddersfield in West Yorkshire, England.

History
The station was said to have been built for and by, the owner of Kirklees Hall the Armytage family.

References

External links
 Cooper Bridge station on navigable 1947 O. S. map

Disused railway stations in Kirklees
Former Lancashire and Yorkshire Railway stations
Railway stations in Great Britain opened in 1840
Railway stations in Great Britain closed in 1950